Henry Michael Nicholls (born 15 November 1991) is a New Zealand cricketer who represents the New Zealand national team and plays for Canterbury in domestic first-class cricket. He has two older brothers, one of whom, Willy Nicholls, is a media correspondent for the Black Caps and White Ferns. He has also been the captain of the reserve A side since 2017.

International career
In December 2015, Nicholls was named in New Zealand's One Day International (ODI) squad for their series against Sri Lanka. He made his ODI debut on 26 December 2015 at Hagley Oval, Christchurch, which is his home ground for Canterbury. He scored 23 not out off 21 balls in that game as New Zealand won by 7 wickets.

He scored 82 runs, against Pakistan on 25 January 2016 at Basin Reserve, which became a match-winning knock at the end. New Zealand won the match by 70 runs and Nicholls adjudged man of the match as well.

He made his Test debut on 12 February 2016 against Australia.

In February 2016, Nicholls was added to New Zealand's squad for the 2016 ICC World Twenty20 tournament, also as a backup wicketkeeper to Luke Ronchi. He made his Twenty20 International debut for New Zealand on 26 March 2016 against Bangladesh in the 2016 ICC World Twenty20 tournament.

In March 2017, during the second Test against South Africa at the Basin Reserve, Wellington, Nicholls scored his first century in Tests, scoring 118 in the first innings.

In May 2018, he was one of twenty players to be awarded a new contract for the 2018–19 season by New Zealand Cricket. In January 2019, during the third ODI against Sri Lanka, Nicholls scored his first ODI century, making 124 not out off 80 balls.

In April 2019, he was named in New Zealand's squad for the 2019 Cricket World Cup. In the Final, he top scored for New Zealand with 55 runs. In November 2020, Nicholls was named in the New Zealand A cricket team for practice matches against the touring West Indies team.

References

External links
 

1991 births
Living people
New Zealand cricketers
New Zealand Test cricketers
New Zealand One Day International cricketers
New Zealand Twenty20 International cricketers
Canterbury cricketers
Cricketers at the 2019 Cricket World Cup
Cricketers from Christchurch
Derbyshire cricketers
Sydney Thunder cricketers
South Island cricketers